The Cotulla Ranch is a historic ranch near Cotulla in La Salle County, Texas, U.S.. It was established in the 1860s by Joseph Cotulla, a Polish immigrant who served in the Union Army during the American Civil War. It has been listed on the National Register of Historic Places since June 13, 2014.

See also

National Register of Historic Places listings in La Salle County, Texas

References

Ranches in Texas
National Register of Historic Places in La Salle County, Texas